Gule ærter may refer to:
A Danish dish of pea soup
A song by De Nattergale